P. Karthiyayini is an Indian politician and incumbent Mayor of Vellore Municipal Corporation. She represented All India Anna Dravida Munnetra Kazhagam party. Recently, she joined BJP party.

References 

All India Anna Dravida Munnetra Kazhagam politicians
Living people
Mayors of places in Tamil Nadu
People from Vellore
Women mayors of places in Tamil Nadu
21st-century Indian women politicians
21st-century Indian politicians
Year of birth missing (living people)